Aughalish is a townland in County Antrim, Northern Ireland. It is situated in the historic barony of Toome Upper and the civil parish of Drummaul and covers an area of 93 acres.

The name derives from the Irish: Achadh Lis (field of the fort).

The population of the townland decreased during the 19th century:

See also 
List of townlands in County Antrim

References

Townlands of County Antrim
Civil Parish of Drummaul